Heberto Neblina Vega (born 17 February 1969) is a Mexican politician affiliated with the PAN. As of 2013 he served as Deputy of the LXII Legislature of the Mexican Congress representing Sonora.

References

1969 births
Living people
Politicians from Sonora
National Action Party (Mexico) politicians
People from San Luis Río Colorado
21st-century Mexican politicians
Deputies of the LXII Legislature of Mexico
Members of the Chamber of Deputies (Mexico) for Sonora